Castagne is a surname. Notable people with the surname include:

Jean Louis Martin Castagne (1785–1858), French botanist
Joseph Castagné (1875–1958), French ethnographer
Patrick Castagne (1916–2000), Trinidadian composer
Timothy Castagne (born 1995), Belgian footballer